Jessy Mendiola-Manzano (born Jessica Mendiola Tawile, ; December 3, 1992) is a Filipino actress.

Early life
Mendiola was born in Dubai, where her father used to work. She is the second of three siblings of a Filipino mother and a Lebanese father.  She was three years old when her mother moved and brought her and her elder sister Pamela to the Philippines. Her mother left her father due to his infidelity. Jessy's younger sister Megan was born in Mexico, where her parents reconciled but eventually separated again for unknown reasons. She remains in contact with her father, who works overseas as a marine anthropologist. She studied mass communication at Far Eastern University.

Career
Jessy Mendiola was one of the 18 new talents launched by ABS-CBN under Star Magic Batch 15. She, along with Megan Young, Alfonso Martinez, Carlo Guevarra and her Star Magic batchmates, joined the cast of Star Magic Presents: Abt Ur Luv, when it was revamped to Abt Ur Luv Ur Lyf 2 in 2007. She also had a minor role in Sineserye Presents: Natutulog Ba ang Diyos?.

In 2008, she was cast as Chappy Girl in the TV series Volta, which was adapted from the Star Cinema film of the same name.

In 2010, she had a guest appearance in George and Cecil, playing the love interest of Dino Imperial's Jun. Mendiola revealed that she was pulled out of Habang May Buhay and was cast as Christina in the TV series Kung Tayo'y Magkakalayo instead. Mendiola was supposed to appear in Habang May Buhay and was featured in the 2008 trailer of the show which was originally titled as Humingi Ako sa Langit. The TV series, which was supposed to air in 2008, was cancelled, reshot and recast. Due to good feedback, her one-week guest appearance in Kung Tayo'y Magkakalayo was extended. She was later cast in Your Song Presents: Gimik 2010, playing the role of the reformed rebel teenager Jessy. Mendiola was supposed to appear in Kokey @ Ako, opposite Enrique Gil, but their characters were written off in favor of Melai Cantiveros and Jason Francisco. She eventually returned as a recurring character in the last few episodes of Kung Tayo'y Magkakalayo.

She portrayed lead roles in Maalaala Mo Kaya: "Marriage Contract" and in Wansapanataym: "Kakambal Ko'y Manika". Her first biggest break was playing the title role in the afternoon TV show, Sabel.

In 2011, when Sabel ended, Mendiola joined ASAP Rocks. She along with Empress Schuck, Enchong Dee and Sam Concepcion are referred to as ASAP's 'Dance Quad'.  Earlier, she portrayed Isabel Valderama in Agimat: Ang Mga Alamat ni Ramon Revilla Presents: Bianong Bulag. In April, she became a guest judge for It's Showtime and appeared as Risa in the Maalaala Mo Kaya episode, "Medalyon". She also played the role of Jacqueline Marasigan in the primetime TV show, Budoy, opposite Gerald Anderson and Enrique Gil.

In 2012, she starred in the film The Reunion, with Enchong Dee, Enrique Gil and Xian Lim. She also starred in the afternoon TV show Precious Hearts Romances Presents: Paraiso, with Matteo Guidicelli, Matt Evans and Jewel Mische.

In 2013, Mendiola played the titular role in the Philippine remake of Maria Mercedes. In October, she flew to South Korea for a ceremonial appointment by Korea Tourism Organization as the Honorary Ambassador for Korean Tourism.

In 2015, Mendiola played another lead role in the comedy drama Must Date the Playboy, alongside Kim Chiu, Xian Lim and Matt Evans. and in the romantic family drama You're My Home, alongside Dawn Zulueta, Richard Gomez and JC de Vera.

In 2016, Mendiola was recognized as the No. 1 Sexiest Woman in the Philippines by the men's magazine FHM Philippines. She landed fourth place in the same list of sexiest women in the Philippines the following year.

Personal life
On December 12, 2020, Mendiola became engaged to television host Luis Manzano. The two had been dating since June 2016. Mendiola and Manzano were married on February 21, 2021.  Their first child, a girl, was born on December 29, 2022.

Filmography

Television

Film

References

External links 
 
 

1992 births
Filipino child actresses
Filipino television actresses
Filipino people of British descent
Filipino people of Lebanese descent
Living people
Star Magic
Viva Artists Agency
People from Dubai
Filipino expatriates in the United Arab Emirates
Far Eastern University alumni
ABS-CBN personalities